Joe Wheeler State Park is a public recreation area with resort features located on Wheeler Lake, an impoundment of the Tennessee River in northwest Alabama. The state park contains  of land in three separate parcels and adjoins the Tennessee Valley Authority's Wheeler Dam.

History
The park was established when the state purchased land from the TVA in 1949. Resort features were added during a major upgrade begun in 1973. The park, the lake and dam all are named for Confederate general and U.S. Congressman Joseph Wheeler.

Awards 
In September 2020, Joe Wheeler State Park was one of eleven Alabama state parks awarded Tripadvisor’s Traveler’s Choice Award, which recognizes businesses and attractions that earn consistently high user reviews.

Activities and amenities
The Rogersville area of the park includes a resort lodge, convention facilities, restaurant, campground, 140-slip marina, 18-hole golf course, and  loop trail for hiking and biking. The TVA maintains a dam overlook near the state park's cabin area.

References

External links
 Joe Wheeler State Park Alabama Department of Conservation and Natural Resources
 

State parks of Alabama
Huntsville-Decatur, AL Combined Statistical Area
Decatur metropolitan area, Alabama
Protected areas of Lauderdale County, Alabama
Protected areas of Lawrence County, Alabama
Protected areas established in 1949
1949 establishments in Alabama